Brian Wayne Taylor (born 10 April 1962) is a former Australian rules footballer and current Australian Football League (AFL) commentator on television for the Seven Network. He played with Richmond and Collingwood from 1980 to 1990.

Playing career 
He was only 16 when recruited from Mandurah, Western Australia, to the Richmond Football Club.

The moustached Taylor, known as "BT" and "Bristle", began his VFL career with Richmond in 1980. He was a full-forward at the same club as the legendary Michael Roach. This limited his playing opportunities, and so he asked to be transferred to Collingwood after the 1984 season, having played 43 games and kicking 156 goals. His height was 191 cm and his weight was 102 kg.

In 1985, Taylor joined Collingwood. He kicked 100 goals in 1986 to win the Coleman Medal. Due to repeated knee injuries, he retired from playing in the AFL at the end of the 1990 season at 28 years of age. He had played 97 games for Collingwood, kicking 371 goals.

Early in Taylor's career, he has admitted he had a problem with controlling his aggression, which he was involved in some remembered physical, comical moments.  But stated later in his career, he improved at controlling his aggression.

In 1991 Taylor became playing coach of Prahran in the VFA. In 1992, after he had kicked 16 and 9 goals in the opening two rounds, his knee gave way and he retired from playing after finishing that season with 64 goals. Continuing as coach, he again took the Two Blues to the finals. He retired as coach shortly before the 1994 season due to media commitments.

Statistics

|-style="background-color: #EAEAEA"
! scope="row" style="text-align:center" | 1980
|style="text-align:center;"|
| 21 || 1 || 0 || 0 || 2 || 1 || 3 || 0 ||  || 0.0 || 0.0 || 2.0 || 1.0 || 3.0 || 0.0 || 
|-
! scope="row" style="text-align:center" | 1981
|style="text-align:center;"|
| 21 || 5 || 5 || 5 || 14 || 7 || 21 || 10 ||  || 1.0 || 1.0 || 2.8 || 1.4 || 4.2 || 2.0 || 
|-style="background-color: #EAEAEA"
! scope="row" style="text-align:center" | 1982
|style="text-align:center;"|
| 21 || 15 || 71 || 25 || 110 || 23 || 133 || 78 ||  || 4.7 || 1.7 || 7.3 || 1.5 ||8.9 || 5.2 || 
|-
! scope="row" style="text-align:center" | 1983
|style="text-align:center;"|
| 21 || 6 || 19 || 16 || 41 || 23 || 64 || 33 ||  || 3.2 || 2.7 || 6.8 || 3.8 || 10.7 || 5.5 || 
|-style="background-color: #EAEAEA"
! scope="row" style="text-align:center" | 1984
|style="text-align:center;"|
| 21 || 16 || 61 || 44 || 125 || 24 || 149 || 90 ||  || 3.8 || 2.8 || 7.8 || 1.5 || 9.3 || 5.6 || 
|-
! scope="row" style="text-align:center" | 1985
|style="text-align:center;"|
| 9 || 21 || 80 || 37 || 168 || 42 || 210 || 111 ||  || 3.8 || 1.8 || 8.0 || 2.0 || 10.0 || 5.3 || 
|-style="background-color: #EAEAEA"
! scope="row" style="text-align:center" | 1986
|style="text-align:center;"|
| 9 || 20 || bgcolor="DD6E81"| 100 || bgcolor="DD6E81"| 63 || 192 || 36 || 228 || 135 ||  || bgcolor="DD6E81"| 5.0 || 3.2 || 9.6 || 1.8 || 11.4 || 6.8 || 
|-
! scope="row" style="text-align:center" | 1987
|style="text-align:center;"|
| 9 || 18 || 60 || 28 || 121 || 45 || 166 || 79 || 14 || 3.3 || 1.6 || 6.7 || 2.5 || 9.2 || 4.4 || 0.8
|-style="background-color: #EAEAEA"
! scope="row" style="text-align:center" | 1988
|style="text-align:center;"|
| 9 || 21 || 73 || 38 || 136 || 37 || 173 || 104 || 10 || 3.5 || 1.8 || 6.5 || 1.8 || 8.2 || 5.0 || 0.5
|-
! scope="row" style="text-align:center" | 1989
|style="text-align:center;"|
| 9 || 11 || 49 || 27 || 85 || 23 || 108 || 58 || 4 || 4.5 || 2.5 || 7.7 || 2.1 || 9.8 || 5.3 || 0.4
|-style="background-color: #EAEAEA"
! scope="row" style="text-align:center" | 1990
|style="text-align:center;"|
| 9 || 6 || 9 || 6 || 21 || 7 || 28 || 12 || 2 || 1.5 || 1.0 || 3.5 || 1.2 || 4.7 || 2.0 || 0.3
|- class="sortbottom"
! colspan=3| Career
! 140
! 527
! 289
! 1015
! 268
! 1283
! 710
! 30
! 3.8
! 2.1
! 7.3
! 1.9
! 9.2
! 5.1
! 0.5
|}

Media career 
Towards the end of his playing career, Taylor was approached to write a weekly column in the Sunday Herald newspaper.  He kept a diary throughout the 1990 season, publishing it as Black and White: The Taylor Diaries.
 
On radio, Taylor started out with 3UZ in 1991 before becoming was the lead commentator for the Triple M commentary team from 1997 when the station became the first FM radio station to broadcast Australian rules football matches.

In 2010, he joined 3AW's football commentary team as chief football caller, replacing Rex Hunt who had moved to Triple M to call football on Saturday afternoons. Taylor called the Friday night and either the Saturday or Sunday afternoon game for 3AW, alternating with Tony Leonard subject to commitments with the Seven Network. Taylor's five-year contract with 3AW ended at the conclusion of the 2014 football season and was not renewed. 3AW's General Manager, Shane Healy, stated that Taylor "would focus on his TV career and that 3AW would move forward in 2015 without his involvement". It was later confirmed Taylor would re-join Triple M to call Sunday matches. In 2016 he also appeared on The Saturday Rub alongside James Brayshaw, Danny Frawley and Damian Barrett.

On television, Taylor was an AFL commentator for the Nine Network from 2002 until the station lost the  broadcasting rights in 2006 to the Seven Network, he mainly called Sunday matches with Brayshaw and Garry Lyon. He remained with the station as a panellist on The Sunday Footy Show until 2010 while also being the host of AFL Teams and calling a Sunday match on Fox Sports from 2009 to 2011.

From the start of the 2012 season, Taylor started calling Saturday night matches for the Seven Network and remained in the role until the end of the 2016 season.

In 2017, Taylor replaced the retiring Dennis Cometti joining Bruce McAvaney as a commentator of Friday night while also doing Sunday afternoon games for Seven, while remaining calling Saturday afternoon games for Triple M.

Also in 2017, Taylor started a segment during the Channel Seven coverage called "Roaming Brian". During this live segment he roves around in the winning teams' change rooms collecting ad-lib interviews with players. Often catching them off-guard, Taylor manages to get some candid, off-the-cuff comments from players, coaches, relatives, and other AFL identities, which provide some entertaining moments for viewers. Players are usually willing to be interviewed, though in 2018 he was rebuffed by Richmond's Toby Nankervis.

Controversy
On 12 July 2014, during the Seven Network's Saturday Night Football preview, Taylor called Geelong player Harry Taylor a "big poofter". The incident was widely condemned and Taylor apologised at half time. He was stood down from his role of broadcasting a match the following afternoon on radio station 3AW.

References

External links

Richmond Football Club players
1962 births
Living people
Collingwood Football Club players
Coleman Medal winners
Prahran Football Club players
Prahran Football Club coaches
Australian rules football commentators
Australian rules footballers from Western Australia
Australian television presenters
Triple M presenters
People from Mandurah
Victorian State of Origin players